Kolahi (also Romanized as Kolāhī) is a village in Tiab Rural District, in the Central District of Minab County, Hormozgan Province, Iran. At the 2006 census, its population was 4,537, in 886 families.

References 

Populated places in Minab County